Ted Castle may refer to:

 Edward Castle, Baron Castle (1907–1979), British journalist and politician
 Ted Castle (photographer) (1918–2000), American photojournalist
 Ted Castle, founder of Rhino Foods, an American ice cream manufacturer